Janvry is a commune in the Essonne department and Île-de-France region of north-central France.

The inhabitants of Janvry are known in French as les Janvryssois.

See also
Château de Janvry
Communes of the Essonne department

References

External links

Chateau de Janvry 
Mayors of Essonne Association 

Communes of Essonne